Cetobacterium is a Gram-negative, pleomorphic, non-spore-forming, rod-shaped and non-motile  genus of bacteria from the family of Fusobacteriaceae.

References

Further reading 
 
 
 
 
 

Fusobacteriota
Bacteria genera